Santa Magalhães Airport  is the airport serving Serra Talhada, Brazil.

It is operated by Dix Empreendimentos.

History
Previously operated by Infracea, on May 16, 2022 the concessionary Dix started operating the facility.

Airlines and destinations

Access

See also

List of airports in Brazil

References

External links

Airports in Pernambuco